Strictly Dynamite is a 1934 American pre-Code film directed by Elliott Nugent and starring Lupe Vélez and Jimmy Durante.

Premise
Norman Foster plays a poet whose life changes when he begins writing comedy for Durante and develops an infatuation for Durante's volatile partner.

Cast
 Jimmy Durante as Moxie
 Lupe Vélez as Vera
 Norman Foster as Nick
 William Gargan as Georgie
 Marian Nixon as Sylvia
 Eugene Pallette as Sourwood
 Sterling Holloway as Fleming
 Minna Gombell as Miss LaSeur
 Leila Bennett as Miss Hoffman
 Franklin Pangborn as Mr. Bailey
 Berton Churchill as Mr. Rivers
 Irene Franklin as Mrs. Figg
 Jackie Searl as Robin (as Jackie Searle)
 Stanley Fields as Pussy
 Tom Kennedy as Junior
 Burton Lane (uncredited)
 Elliott Nugent (uncredited)
 Leonid Kinsky as Garçon, a servant to Moxie (uncredited)

References

External links

1934 films
Films directed by Elliott Nugent
1934 comedy films
American comedy films
American black-and-white films
1930s American films